Tsubasa (written: 翼, 翔, 飛翔 or つばさ in hiragana) is a unisex Japanese given name. Notable people with the name include:
Tsubasa (wrestler), Japanese professional wrestler
, Japanese footballer
, Japanese baseball player
, Japanese actress
, Japanese footballer
, Japanese footballer
, Japanese manga artist
, Japanese speed skater
, Japanese Volleyball player
, Japanese actress and model
, Japanese singer and actor
, Japanese contemporary artist
, Japanese wheelchair racer
, Japanese cyclist
, Japanese footballer
, Japanese professional wrestler
, Japanese fashion model
, Japanese footballer
, Japanese footballer
, Japanese footballer
, Japanese voice actress
, Japanese footballer
, Japanese footballer
Tsubasa Sasaki (born 1995), Japanese slalom canoeist
, Japanese footballer
, Japanese footballer
, Japanese footballer
, Japanese manga artist
, Japanese footballer
, Japanese voice actor and singer
, Japanese footballer

Fictional characters
 Tsubasa Andō, a character in the anime and manga series Gakuen Alice
 Tsubasa Hanekawa, a character in the Monogatari series
 Tsubasa Kazanari, a character in the anime series Symphogear
 Tsubasa Kurenai, a character in the anime series Ranma ½
 Tsubasa Li (李 ツバサ), one of the protagonists of the manga Tsubasa: Reservoir Chronicle
, a character in the anime series Gatchaman Crowds
 Tsubasa Nishikiori, a character featured in the works of Go Nagai
, protagonist of the manga series Captain Tsubasa
 , one of the protagonists of Tokyo Mirage Sessions ♯FE
 Tsubasa Otori, one of the protagonists in Beyblade: Metal Fusion
 Tsubasa Ozu,  a character in the tokusatsu series Mahou Sentai Magiranger
 Tsubasa Sena, a character in the anime series Aikatsu!

Japanese unisex given names